Tedo Abzhandadze (born 13 June 1999) is a Georgian rugby union player who plays as a fly-half for AIA Kutaisi in the Didi 10 and the Georgia national team. He was member of the Georgia U20 squad for the 2017 World Rugby Under 20 Championship, 2018 World Rugby Under 20 Championship and the 2019 World Rugby Under 20 Championship. Tedo played 2019 Rugby World Cup for Georgia national team.

References

External links
 

1999 births
Living people
Rugby union players from Georgia (country)
Georgia international rugby union players
Rugby union fly-halves